Ralph Gonzalez Recto (born January 11, 1964) is a Filipino politician, who, since 2022, is serving as the representative for Batangas' 6th district and is one of the House Deputy Speakers. He previously served three terms in the Senate: from 2001 to 2007 and from 2010 to 2022 and had served as president pro tempore of the Senate and Senate Minority Leader. He started his political career as the representative of Batangas' 4th district from 1992 to 2001.

In 2007, Recto lost his Senate reelection bid because, as many analysts believed, he had authored the unpopular EVAT (Expanded Value Added Tax) law. In July 2008 he was appointed to head the National Economic and Development Authority (NEDA) in the Arroyo administration, but resigned from his position in August 2009 in preparation for another run for the Senate in the 2010 elections.

He is a grandson of statesman Claro M. Recto. His wife is actress-politician Vilma Santos.

Early life
Recto comes from a political family. His grandfather, the late nationalist and statesman Claro M. Recto, was a Senator for several terms. His father, Atty. Rafael Recto (d. 2022), was an Assemblyman during the Regular Batasang Pambansa while his older brother, Ricky Recto, was the former vice governor of the province of Batangas.

His late mother is Carmen Gonzalez-Recto. His sister, Plinky Recto, is an actress and TV host.

Education
Recto acquired a Bachelor of Science degree in business administration at the De La Salle–College of Saint Benilde, at the time was a constituent college of De La Salle University. He entered the College of Public Administration of the University of the Philippines, Diliman to acquire a Master of Public Administration degree; he attended the program in the first semester from 1991 to 1992, but later entered the University of Asia and the Pacific to take an 11-month course to acquire a Master in Business Economics (Candidate) under the Strategic Business Economics Program of the university's School of Economics. He also took up a Leadership Scholarship Course at the John F. Kennedy School of Government at Harvard University in Boston, Massachusetts, United States.

Political career

House of Representatives: 1992–2001
Recto holds the distinction of being the youngest elected member of the House of Representatives during the 9th Congress. He also holds an unprecedented record in the congressional election history of Batangas for winning in all precincts, barangays, and municipalities, together with Lipa City, in the 1995 and 1998 elections. He garnered 98% of the votes cast in those two elections in the 4th District of Batangas.

During his three terms (from 1992 to 2001) as a member of the House of Representatives, most of his legislative measures enacted into law deal with economic reforms and poverty alleviation, among which are the Social Reform and Poverty Alleviation Act; the Philippine Economic Zone Law; Amendment to the Special Economic Zone Law; the Retail Trade Liberalization Law; Regional Headquarters Law; and the Comprehensive Tax Reform Law.

First term in the Senate: 2001–2007
Recto was elected to the Senate in 2001, becoming the youngest Senator of the 12th Congress at the age of 37. In the Senate, he chaired the Committees on Ways and Means and on Trade and Industry.

He was co-chairman of the Congressional Oversight Committees on the Proper Implementation of the National Internal Revenue Code (NIRC) and on the Official Development Assistance (ODA). He was also chairman of the Accounts committee.

During his first six-year term as Senator, he was largely responsible for the passage of laws with positive impact to consumers, small entrepreneurs, workers and industry.

National Economic and Development Authority: 2008–2009
After his failed bid for re-election to the Senate in 2007, Recto joined the board of the Union Bank of the Philippines.

He is said to be offered the position of Secretary of Finance but it was subsequently denied by Malacañang.

President Gloria Macapagal Arroyo, on July 23, 2008, named him as the new director-general of National Economic and Development Authority, replacing Augusto Santos, acting NEDA chief. On August 11, 2009, he resigned as NEDA secretary and Presidential Adviser for Economic Planning, in preparation for another run for Senate in the 2010 election.

Second term in the Senate: 2010–2016
He was proclaimed as one of the winning senatorial candidates of the 2010 Senate elections.

On July 22, 2013, at the start of the first day of the 1st Regular Session of the Senate for the 16th Congress, Recto was elected Senate President Pro-Tempore, the second highest post in the Senate and was also the Chairman of the Senate
Committee on Science and Technology and member of the powerful bicameral Commission on Appointments.

His legislative accomplishments during this period include authorship of laws on institutionalization of Kindergarten, implementation of K to 12, extension of the corporate life of the Philippine National Railways (PNR), increasing the tax-exempt ceiling on 13th month pay, Christmas bonus and other benefits, mandatory PHILHEALTH coverage for senior citizens, additional benefits for Persons with Disabilities (PWDs), PAGASA modernization, extension of the Agricultural Competitiveness Enhancement Fund (ACEF) and the Armed Forces of the Philippines (AFP) modernization, creation of the Department of Information and Communications Technology (DICT), and Customs Modernization and Tariff Act.

Recto participated and was very vocal during the Senate hearings on Balikbayan boxes scam, the "Laglag bala" incidents in airports, and the shortage of license plates, among other things.

Third term in the  Senate: 2016–2022
Recto ran for re-election in the 2016 Philippine Senate election under the Koalisyon ng Daang Matuwid of
LP standard bearer Mar Roxas and won placing 11th in the polls.

On the opening day of the 17th Congress, July 25, 2016, Senator Francis Escudero nominated Recto for the presidency. Senator Antonio Trillanes IV seconded Escudero's nomination. During nominal voting, Pimentel voted for Recto. Recto voted for Pimentel. After losing the vote, Recto automatically became the Minority Leader. He was joined by Escudero and Trillanes. Recto, in his acceptance speech for the post, vowed that the minority would cooperate with the Duterte administration's plans if these serve "the public interest." However, he said, they would be "duty-bound" to oppose the majority's agenda if it "hurts the nation."

When the Senate underwent a reorganization on February 27, 2017, Recto, after getting 17 votes, was declared Senate President Pro Tempore, replacing Drilon.

For the 17th Congress, he authored the following laws: Murang Kuryente Act, Pantawid Pamilyang Pilipino Program Act, Child Safety in Motor Vehicles Act, Universal Health Care Act, Philhealth Coverage for PWDs, National Integrated Cancer Control Act, Tax Amnesty Act, The New Central Bank Act, Lifting Quantitative Import Restriction on Rice, Social Security Act, First 1000 Days of Life, Universal Access to Quality Tertiary Education, Comprehensive National Feeding Program, Free Irrigation Service, Ease of Doing Business/Expanded Anti-Red Tape Act, Free Internet Access in Public Places, Extending the Validity of Philippine Passport and Driver's License, National ID System, and Designating Casinos as Covered Persons under the AMLA.

Recto kept his post as Senate President Pro-Tempore in the 18th Congress.

In September 2018, Recto left the Liberal Party to re-join the Nacionalista Party.

House of Representatives: 2022–present
Upon being term-limited in the Senate, in 2022, Recto ran for a comeback to the House of Representatives, this time at the 6th district of Batangas, which consists of only the city of Lipa. During the campaign, he had endorsed the presidential bid of Manila Mayor Isko Moreno. He then won the election unopposed, succeeding his wife Vilma Santos who chose not to seek reelection. 

On July 27, 2022, Recto was named as a House Deputy Speaker under the speakership of Martin Romualdez.

Laws authored/sponsored

Laws authored/sponsored by Ralph G. Recto:

Duterte administration (17th and 18th Congress)
 RA 11707 - Declaring San Jose, Batangas as the Egg Basket of the Philippines (Co-Author)
 RA 11698 - Vintage Vehicle Registration Act (Co-Author)
 RA 11697 - Electric Vehicle Industry Development Act (Co-Author)
 RA 11694 - Declaring Batangas State University as the National Engineering University (Co-Author)
 RA 11642 - Domestic Administrative Adoption and Alternative Child Care Act (Co-Author)
 RA 11641 - Creating the Department of Migrant Workers Act (Co-Author)
 RA 11635 - Proprietary Educational Institutions Tax Act (Co-Author)
 RA 11595 - Retail Trade Liberalization Act (Lowering the required paid-up capital for Foreign Retail Enterprises) (Co-Author)
 RA 11591 - Fixing the Last Day of Registration of Voters for the 2022 National and Local Elections (September 30, 2021) (Co-Author)
 RA 11591 - Fixing the Last Day of Registration of Voters for the 2022 National and Local Elections (September 30, 2021) (Co-Author)
 RA 11590 - Taxing Philippine Offshore Gaming Operators (POGOs) (September 22,2021) 
 RA 11589 - Strengthening and Modernizing the Bureau of Fire Protection (September 10, 2021) (Co-Author)
 RA 11573 - Improving the Confirmation Process for Imperfect Land Titles (July 16, 2021) (Co-Author)
 RA 11535 - Cooperatives Development Officer (April 9, 2021) (Co-Author)
 RA 11534 - Corporate Recovery and Tax Incentives for Enterprises Act or CREATE (March 26, 2021) (Co-Author)
 RA 11525 - COVID-19 Vaccination Program (February 26, 2021) (Co-Author)
 RA 11524 - Coconut Farmers and Industry Trust Fund Act (February 26, 2021) (Co-Author)
 RA 11523 - Financial Institutions Strategic Transfer Act (February 16, 2021) (Co-Author)
 RA 11520 - Extending the Availability of the 2020 GAA to Dec. 31, 2021 (December 29, 2020) (Co-Author)
 RA 11519 - Extending the Availability of Appropriations under Bayanihan to Recover as One Act (December 29, 2020) (Co-Author)
 RA 11517 - Authorizing the President to Expedite the Processing and Issuance of National and Local Permits, Licenses and Certifications in Times of National Emergency (December 23, 2020) (Co-Author)
 RA 11511 - Amending the Organic Agriculture Act of 2010 (December 23, 2020) (Co-Author)
 RA 11510 - Alternative Learning System Act (December 23, 2020) (Co-Author)
 RA 11509 - Medical Scholarship Act (December 23, 2020) (Co-Author)
 RA 11502 - National Cooperative Month (December 16, 2020) (Co-Author)
 RA 11494 - Bayanihan to Recover as One Act (September 11, 2020) (Co-Author)
 RA 11476 - Comprehensive Values Education Act (June 25, 2020) (Co-Author)
 RA 11469 - Bayanihan to Heal as One Act (March 24, 2020) (Co-Author)
 RA 11468 - National Day of Remembrance for Road Crash Victims, Survivors and Their Families (January 23, 2020) 
 RA 11466 - Salary Standardization Law of 2019 (January 8, 2020) 
 RA 11454 - Disposition of Land in Krus na Ligas, Quezon City (August 30, 2019) 
 RA 11371 - Murang Kuryente Act (August 8, 2019)
 RA 11314 - Student Fare Discount Act (April 17, 2019) (Co-Author)
 RA 11310 - Pantawid Pamilyang Pilipino Program (April 17, 2019) (Co-Author)
 RA 11262 - Extending the Authority of TIEZA to Grant Incentives to Tourism Enterprises (April 10, 2019) (Co-Author)
 RA 11229 - Child Safety in Motor Vehicles Act (February 22, 2019) (Co-Author)
 RA 11228 - Mandatory Philhealth Coverage for all PWDs (February 22, 2019) (Co-Author)
 RA 11223 - Universal Healthcare Act (February 20, 2019) 
 RA 11215 - National Integrated Cancer Control Act (February 14, 2019) (Co-Author)
 RA 11213 - Tax Amnesty Act (February 14, 2019) (Co-Author)
 RA 11211 - New Central Bank Act (February 14, 2019) (Co-Author)
 RA 11203 - Rice Tariffication Act (February 14, 2019) 
 RA 11199 - Social Security Act of 2018 (February 7, 2019) 
 RA 11148 - Kalusugan at Nutrisyon ng Magnanay Act (November 29, 2018) (Co-Author)
 RA 11055 - Philippine Identification System Act (August 6, 2018) (Co-Author)
 RA 11037 - Masustansiyang Pagkain Para sa Batang Pilipino (June 20, 2018) (Co-Author)
 RA 11032 - Ease of Doing Business and Efficient Government Service Delivery Act of 2018 (May 28, 2019) 
 RA 10969 - Free Irrigation Service Act (February 2, 2018) (Co-Author)
 RA 10963 - Tax Reform for Acceleration and Inclusion (TRAIN) (December 19, 2017)
 RA 10931 - Universal Access to Quality Tertiary Education (August 3, 2017) 
 RA 10930 - Extending the Validity Period of Driver’s License (August 2, 2017) 
 RA 10929 - Free Internet Access in Public Places Act (August 2, 2017) (Co-Author)
 RA 10928 - Extending the Validity of Philippine Passports (August 2, 2017) (Co-Author)
 RA 10927 - Casinos as Covered Persons Under the Anti-Money Laundering Act (July 14, 2017) 

Aquino administration (15th and 16th Congress)
 RA 10868 - Centenarians Act of 2016 (June 30, 2016) 
 RA 10863 - Customs Modernization and Tariff Act (May 30, 2016) (Co-Author)
 RA 10848 - Extending the Period of Implementation of the Agricultural Competitiveness Enhancement Fund (ACEF) (May 23, 2016)
 RA 10844 - Department of Information and Communications Technology (DICT) Act (May 23, 2016)
 RA 10821 - Children's Emergency Relief and Protection Act (May 18, 2016) (Co-Author)
 RA 10801 - Overseas Workers Welfare Administration (OWWA) Act (May 10, 2016) (Co-Author)
 RA 10754 - Additional Benefits for Persons with Disabilities (PWDs) (March 23, 2016) 
 RA 10743 - National Teacher's Day (January 29, 2016) (Co-Author)
 RA 10708 - Tax Incentives Management and Transparency Act (December 9, 2015) (Co-Author)
 RA 10699 - National Athletes and Coaches Benefits and Incentives Act (November 13, 2015) (Co-Author)
 RA 10692 - PAGASA Modernization Act (November 3, 2015)
 RA 10687 - Unified Student Financial Assistance System for Tertiary Education (UniFAST) (October 15, 2015) (Co-Author)
 RA 10665 - Open High School System Act (July 9, 2015) (Co-Author)
 RA 10653 - Increasing the Tax-Exempt Ceiling on 13th Month Pay and Other Benefits (February 12, 2015)
 RA 10650 - Open Learning and Distance Education Act of 2014 (December 9, 2014) (Co-Author)
 RA 10647 - Ladderized Education Act of 2014 (November 21, 2014) (Co-Author)
 RA 10645 - Philhealth Coverage for All Senior Citizens (November 5, 2014) 
 RA 10644 - Go Negosyo Act (July 15, 2014) (Co-Author)
 RA 10638 - Philippine National Railways Charter Extension (June 16, 2014) 
 RA 10612 - Fast-Tracked S&T Scholarship Act of 2013 (August 23, 2013) (Co-Author)
 RA 10606 - National Health Insurance Act of 2013 (June 19, 2013) (Co-Author)
 RA 10533 - Enhancing the Philippine Basic Education System (“K to 12 Program”) (May 15, 2013) 
 RA 10531 - Strengthening the National Electrification Administration (May 7, 2013)
 RA 10390 - Revitalizing the People's Television Network, Inc. (March 14, 2013) (Co-Author)
 RA 10378 - International Common Carriers Tax Exemption (March 7, 2013) 
 RA 10349 - Revised AFP Modernization Program (December 11, 2012) (Co-Author)
 RA 10174 - People's Survival Fund (August 16, 2012) (Co-Author)
 RA 10165 - Foster Care Act of 2012 (June 11, 2012) (Co-Author)
 RA 10157 - Kindergarten Education Act (January 20, 2012) 
 RA 10154 - Early Release of Retirement Pay, Pensions, Gratuity and Other Benefits of Retiring Government Employees (July 14, 2011) (Co-Author)
 RA 10149 - GOCC Governance Act of 2011 (June 6, 2011) (Co-Author)

Arroyo administration (12th & 13th Congress)
 RA 9480 - General Tax Amnesty (May 24, 2007)
 RA 9442 - Amendments to the Magna Carta for Disabled Persons (April 30, 2007) (Co-Author)
 RA 9439 - Prohibiting the Detention of Live or Dead Patients in Hospitals on Grounds of Nonpayment of Hospital Bills (April 27, 2007) (Co-Author)
 RA 9422 - Strengthening the Regulatory Functions of the POEA (April 10, 2007) (Co-Author)
 RA 9400 - Amendments to BCDA (March 20, 2007) 
 RA 9399 - BCDA’s One-Time Tax Amnesty (March 20, 2007) 
 RA 9367 - Biofuels Act of 2006 (January 12, 2007) (Co-Author)
 RA 9361 - Lifting of the 70% Cap on Input VAT (November 21, 2006) 
 RA 9343 - Extension of RA 9182 (Special Purpose Vehicle Act of 2002) (April 24, 2006) 
 RA 9341 - Rent Control Act of 2005 (December 21, 2005)
 RA 9337 - Amendments to the National Internal Revenue Code (May 24, 2005) – (Reformed VAT & Increase in Corporate Income Tax)
 RA 9335 - Attrition Act of 2005 (January 25, 2005) 
 RA 9334 - Increasing the Excise Tax Rates on Alcohol and Tobacco Products (December 21, 2004) 
 RA 9301 - Philippine Overseas Shipping Act (July 27, 2004) 
 RA 9295 - Domestic Shipping Act (May 3, 2004) 
 RA 9294 - Restoring the Tax Exemption of Offshore Banking Units (OBUs) and Foreign Currency Deposit Units (FCDUs) (April 28, 2004) 
 RA 9282 - Expanding the Jurisdiction of the Court of Tax Appeals (CTA) (March 30, 2004)
 RA 9243 - Rationalizing the Provisions of Documentary Stamp Tax (February 17, 2004) 
 RA 9238 - Excluding Several Services from VAT Coverage (February 5, 2004) 
 RA 9224 - Rationalization of Excise Tax on Automobiles (August 29, 2003) 
 RA 9182 - Special Purpose Vehicle Act of 2002 (December 23, 2002) 
 RA 9178 - Barangay Micro Business Enterprises Act of 2002 (November 13, 2002) 
 RA 9167 - Film Development Council of the Philippines (June 7, 2002) (Co-Author)
 RA 9161 - Rental Reform Act of 2002 (December 22, 2001) 

Estrada administration (11th Congress)
 RA 8762 - Retail Trade Liberalization Law (March 7, 2000) 
 RA 8756 - Regional Headquarters Law (November 23, 1999)
 RA 8748 - Amending the Special Economic Zone Act of 1995 (June 1, 1999) (Co-Author)

Ramos administration (9th & 10th Congress)
 RA 8425 - Social Reform and Poverty Alleviation Act (December 11, 1997) 
 RA 8424 - Tax Reform Act of 1997 (December 11, 1997) (Co-Author)
 RA 7916 - Special Economic Zone Act of 1995 (February 24, 1995)

Personal life
He is married to actress and Batangas Representative Vilma Santos-Recto, with whom he has one son Ryan Christian. He is also the stepfather to actor Luis Philippe Manzano. He is an active member of Tau Gamma Phi.

He currently resides in Ayala Alabang, Muntinlupa and in Inosluban, Lipa.

See also 
Aksyon ng Bayan Rosario 2001 And Beyond
Tau Gamma Phi

References

External links
Official Website
Official Facebook Page
Recto's Senate Bio

1964 births
Living people
People from Quezon City
People from Lipa, Batangas
Ralph
Presidents pro tempore of the Senate of the Philippines
Senators of the 18th Congress of the Philippines
Senators of the 17th Congress of the Philippines
Senators of the 16th Congress of the Philippines
Senators of the 15th Congress of the Philippines
Senators of the 13th Congress of the Philippines
Senators of the 12th Congress of the Philippines
Members of the House of Representatives of the Philippines from Batangas
Directors-General of the National Economic and Development Authority of the Philippines
Laban ng Demokratikong Pilipino politicians
Nacionalista Party politicians
Lakas–CMD politicians
Liberal Party (Philippines) politicians
Ateneo de Manila University alumni
De La Salle–College of Saint Benilde alumni
Harvard Kennedy School alumni
Arroyo administration cabinet members
University of Asia and the Pacific alumni
Minority leaders of the Senate of the Philippines